In the Fourth Round of the CONCACAF 2006 World Cup qualification, the six remaining teams from the Third Round were put in a single group, and played against each other home-and-away. The three teams with most points qualified for the 2006 FIFA World Cup. The fourth-placed team, Trinidad and Tobago, advanced to the AFC-CONCACAF playoff against the winner of the Fourth Round of Asia, Bahrain.

There were 83 goals scored in 30 matches, for an average of 2.77 goals per match.

Fourth round

See also

4
2005 in CONCACAF football
2005 in Trinidad and Tobago football
2005 in American soccer
2004–05 in Mexican football
2005–06 in Mexican football
2004–05 in Costa Rican football
2004–05 in Guatemalan football
2005–06 in Guatemalan football
2004–05 in Panamanian football
2005–06 in Panamanian football
Q3
Q3
Q3
Q3